The Masonic Block in Fargo, North Dakota, also known as Dakota Business College or Watkins Block, is an Early Commercial style building built in 1884.  It was designed by Fargo architects Daniels & Proctor.

The building gets its name from the fact that one of the original tenants of the building was a local Masonic lodge.  The lodge rented the third floor of the building, which it used as a meeting hall (the lodge met in the building for only four years, from 1885 to 1889).

Despite the name, the building is better known for its subsequent educational function.   It housed Fargo College from 1887 to 1890, and the Dakota Business College from 1891 to 1978.

Today it is used as a purely commercial building. It is one of few commercial structures in Fargo that survived a fire in 1893.

It was listed on the National Register of Historic Places in 1979.

References

Commercial buildings on the National Register of Historic Places in North Dakota
Commercial buildings completed in 1884
Buildings and structures in Fargo, North Dakota
Buildings designated early commercial in the National Register of Historic Places
Former Masonic buildings in North Dakota
National Register of Historic Places in Cass County, North Dakota
Individually listed contributing properties to historic districts on the National Register in North Dakota
University and college buildings on the National Register of Historic Places in North Dakota
1884 establishments in Dakota Territory